Liezel Huber and Sania Mirza were the defending champions, but Huber chose not to participate that year and Mirza withdrew due to a right wrist sprain.

Vania King and Alla Kudryavtseva defeated Alberta Brianti and Mariya Koryttseva 6–1, 6–4 in the final to win their title.

Seeds

Draw

External links 
Draw

2007 WTA Tour
Sunfeast Open